Scalvini is a surname. Notable people with the surname include:

Gianluigi Scalvini (born 1971), Italian motorcycle road racer
Giorgio Scalvini (born 2003), Italian footballer
Pietro Scalvini (1718–1792), Italian painter

See also
Salvini (surname)

Italian-language surnames